The 2020 Farah Palmer Cup season was the 14th season of New Zealand's women's provincial rugby union competition since it changed formats in 2006, having not been held in 2010. The regular season began on 5 September with Waikato hosting a match against Northland. It involved the top thirteen rugby unions of New Zealand. The competition is known as the Farah Palmer Cup after former Black Ferns captain, Farah Palmer and it is the fifth season under this name. To cut down on travel, the teams were split into North and South pools for the 2020 season, due to the COVID-19 pandemic, and thus no promotion or relegation was applied.

Format
The Farah Palmer Cup standings are sorted by a competition points system. Four points are awarded to the winning team, a draw earns two points, whilst a loss amounts to zero points. Unions can also win their side a respectable bonus point. To receive a bonus point, they must score four tries or more, or lose by seven points or less. Each team is placed on their total points received. If a tiebreaker is necessary, when two or more teams finish on equal points, the union who acquired more competition points against the other tied team(s) gets placed higher. In the case that separation is still not made, the winner of the head-to-head result between the teams will get rights to be ranked above. This seeding format was only implemented for the 2020 competition.

The regular season consists of two types of matches. Each union play home or away games against each team from their division, making a total of six competition games during the regular season for each union in the North pool, and five regular season games for those in the South pool. The finals format sees the top two teams from each pool qualify for cross-over semi-finals. The top placed teams in each pool, based on table points, receive a home semi-final. In the first round of the finals, the semi-finals, the top placed North team is to host the second-placed South team, and the first-placed South team is to host the Second placed North team. The final is to be hosted by the top remaining seed.

Standings

Key: JST - JJ Stewart Trophy holders

* - If three or more Provincial Unions are tied on points, the team with the most competition points against the other tied teams advances. In this instance, Auckland and Northland had six points, Counties Manukau had five. Auckland got six points out of their games with Counties Manukau and Northland (1 against Counties and 5 against Northland). Counties got five points against Auckland and none against Northland, Northland got six points (1 against Auckland and five against Counties). That meant it was between Auckland and Northland, and with Auckland beating Northland head-to-head in pool play, they claim the semi-final position.

Standings progression

Regular season
The 2020 Farah Palmer Cup was played across seven weeks. The competition started on Saturday, 5 September 2020, with Waikato hosting a match against Northland at University of Waikato in Hamilton.

Week 1

Bye: Bay of Plenty, South Division Teams

Week 2

Bye: Counties Manukau

Week 3

Bye: Northland

Week 4

Bye: Waikato

Week 5

Bye: Taranaki

Week 6

Bye: Auckland, South Division Teams

Week 7

Bye: North Harbour

Play-offs

Semi-finals

Finals

JJ Stewart Trophy

The JJ Stewart Trophy is a trophy based on a challenge system, rather than a league or knockout competition as with most football trophies. The holding union must defend the trophy in challenge matches, and if a challenger defeats them, they become the new holder of the trophy.

Canterbury started the season as holders of the trophy and as such, were obligated to place the trophy up for challenge in all of their regular season home games.

Successful JJ Stewart Trophy challenges were played by Canterbury in Round 3, Round 5 and Round 7 against Otago, Wellington and Tasman respectively.

References

External links

Farah Palmer Cup
Farah Palmer Cup
Farah Palmer Cup
September 2020 sports events in New Zealand
October 2020 sports events in New Zealand
Women's rugby union competitions in New Zealand